OpenJPA is an open source implementation of the Java Persistence API specification. It is an object-relational mapping (ORM) solution for the Java language, which simplifies storing objects in databases. It is open-source software distributed under the Apache License 2.0.

History 
Kodo, a Java Data Objects implementation, was originally developed by SolarMetric, Inc in 2001. BEA Systems acquired SolarMetric in 2005, where Kodo was expanded to be an implementation of both the JDO (JSR 12) and JPA (JSR 220) specifications. In 2006, BEA donated a large part of the Kodo source code to the Apache Software Foundation under the name OpenJPA. The donated source code will be the core persistence engine of BEA Weblogic Server, IBM WebSphere, and the Geronimo Application Server. In May 2007, OpenJPA graduated from the incubator to a top-level project and also passed Sun's Technology Compatibility Kit compliant with the Java Persistence API.

See also 

 Persistence
 EclipseLink
 Hibernate
 ActiveJPA
 NoSQL datastores like Infinispan

References

External links 
 
Kodo Towards an Open Source EJB 3.0 Persistence Engine by Jon Mountjoy
Leveraging OpenJPA with WebSphere Application Server V6.1
An update on Java Persistence API 2.0 by Kevin Sutter
Interview with Patrick Linskey discusses OpenJPA and the JPA specification on August 23, 2007

OpenJPA
Object-relational mapping
Java enterprise platform